Midlands 2 East (South) is a level 7 English Rugby Union league and level 2 of the Midlands League, made up of teams from the southern part of the East Midlands region including sides from Bedfordshire, Leicestershire, Northamptonshire and occasionally Cambridgeshire and Oxfordshire, who play home and away matches throughout the season.  When this division began in 1992 it was known as Midlands East 1, until it was split into two regional divisions called Midlands 3 East (North) and Midlands 3 East (South) ahead of the 2000–01 season.  Further restructuring of the Midlands leagues ahead of the 2009–10 season, led to the current name of Midlands 2 East (South).

Promoted teams tend to move up to Midlands 1 East with the champions going up automatically and the runners up having to play a playoff against the runners up from Midlands 2 East (North) for their place. Demoted teams typically drop to Midlands 3 East (South).  Each year all clubs in the division also take part in the RFU Intermediate Cup - a level 7 national competition.

2021-22

Participating teams & locations

2020–21
Due to the COVID-19 pandemic, the 2020–21 season was cancelled.

2019–20

Participating teams & locations

2018–19

Participating teams & locations

2017–18

Participating teams & locations

Teams 2016-17
Belgrave
Luton
Lutterworth
Market Harborough
Melton Mowbray 
Oadby Wanderers
Oakham
Old Laurentians  (relegated from Midlands 1 East)
Olney 
Oundle (promoted from Midlands 3 East (South))
Peterborough
Rushden & Higham
Stamford (transferred from Midlands 2 East (North))
Vipers

Teams 2015-16
Belgrave (relegated from Midlands 1 East)
Biggleswade
Leicester Forest
Lutterworth
Market Harborough
Melton Mowbray (promoted from Midlands 3 East (North))
Oadby Wanderers
Oakham
Olney 
Peterborough
Rushden & Higham (promoted from Midlands 3 East (South))
Vipers (promoted from Midlands 3 East (South))

Teams 2014-15
Biggleswade (promoted from Midlands 3 East (South))
Dunstablians
Leicester Forest	
Lutterworth	
Market Harborough
Northampton Old Scouts	
Oadby Wyggestonians
Oakham
Olney	
Peterborough (relegated from Midlands 1 East)	
Stewarts & Lloyds (promoted from Midlands 3 East (South))
Wellingborough

Teams 2013-14
Dunstablians
Leicester Forest
Leighton Buzzard
Lutterworth
Market Harborough
Newbold-on-Avon (transferred from Midlands 2 West (South))	
Northampton BBOB
Northampton Old Scouts
Oadby Wyggestonians
Olney	
Rushden & Higham (promoted from Midlands 3 East (South))
Wellingborough

Teams 2012–13
Biggleswade (promoted from Midlands 3 East (South))
Bugbrooke
Dunstablians	
Huntingdon & District	
Leighton Buzzard (relegated from Midlands 1 East)
Lutterworth
Market Harborough
Northampton BBOB (promoted from Midlands 3 East (South))
Northampton Old Scouts
Oadby Wyggestonians
Vipers
Wellingborough

After leading the division from matchday 1, Huntingdon & District were pipped to the title by Bugbrooke by way of bonus points on the season's final day. Huntingdon were promoted alongside Bugbrooke to Midlands 1 East following a playoff victory over the second placed team from Midlands 2 East (North), Oakham. Biggleswade joined Vipers in the relegation places following a final day defeat to Oadby Wyggestonians.

Teams 2011–12
Bugbrooke
Dunstablians
Huntingdon
Long Buckby
Lutterworth
Market Harborough
Northampton Old Scouts
Oadby Wygstonians
Peterborough Lions
Stockwood Park
Vipers
Wellingborough

Teams 2010-11
Bugbrooke
Huntingdon and District
Leicester Forest
Lutterworth
Market Harborough
Northampton BBOB
Northampton Old Scouts
Peterborough Lions
Stewarts and Lloyds
Stockwood Park
Towcestrians
Vipers

Original teams

Teams in Midlands 2 East (North) and Midlands 2 East (South) were originally part of a single division called Midlands 1 East, which contained the following sides when in was introduced in 1992:

Amber Valley - relegated from Midlands 2 East (9th)
Ampthill - promoted from East Midlands/Leicestershire (5th)
Belgrave - promoted from East Midlands/Leicestershire (3rd)
Chesterfield Panthers - promoted from Nott, Lincs & Derbyshire 1 (champions)
Dronfield - promoted from Nott, Lincs & Derbyshire 1 (5th)
Hinckley - promoted from East Midlands/Leicestershire (champions)
Luton - promoted from East Midlands/Leicestershire (4th)
Mellish - promoted from Nott, Lincs & Derbyshire 1 (4th)
Scunthorpe - relegated from Midlands 2 East (10th)
Spalding - promoted from Nott, Lincs & Derbyshire 1 (runners up)
Stewarts & Lloyds - relegated from Midlands 2 East (11th)
Stoneygate - promoted from East Midlands/Leicestershire (runners up)
West Bridgford - promoted from Nott, Lincs & Derbyshire 1 (3rd)

Midlands 2 East (South) honours

Midlands East 1 (1992–1993)

Midlands 2 East (North) and Midlands 2 East (South) were originally part of a single tier 7 division called Midlands East 1.  Promotion was to Midlands 2 and relegation to Midlands East 2.

Midlands East 1 (1993–1996)

The top six teams from Midlands 1 and the top six from North 1 were combined to create National 5 North, meaning that Midlands 1 East dropped to become a tier 8 league.  Promotion and relegation continued to Midlands 2 and Midlands East 2.

Midlands East 1 (1996–2000)

At the end of the 1995–96 season National 5 North was discontinued and Midlands East 1 returned to being a tier 7 league.  Promotion and relegation continued to Midlands 2 and Midlands East 2.

Midlands 3 East (South) (2000–2009)

Restructuring ahead of the 2000–01 season saw Midlands East 1 split into two tier 7 regional leagues - Midlands 3 East (North) and Midlands 3 East (South).  Promotion was now to Midlands 2 East (formerly Midlands 2) and relegation to Midlands 4 East (South) (formerly Midlands East 2).

Midlands 2 East (South) (2009–present)

League restructuring by the RFU meant that Midlands 3 East (North) and Midlands 3 East (South) were renamed as Midlands 2 East (North) and Midlands 2 East (South), with both leagues remaining at tier 7.  Promotion was now to Midlands 1 East (formerly Midlands 2 East) and relegation to Midlands 3 East (South) (formerly Midlands 4 East (South)).

Promotion play-offs
Since the 2000–01 season there has been a play-off between the runners-up of Midlands 2 East (North) and Midlands 2 East (South) for the third and final promotion place to Midlands 1 East (asides from 2008-09 which was played between the runners up of Midlands 2 West (South) and Midlands 2 East (North) due to RFU restructuring). The team with the superior league record has home advantage in the tie.  At the end of the 2019–20 season the Midlands 2 East (South) teams have ten wins to the Midlands 2 East (North) teams eight; and the home team has won promotion on thirteen occasions compared to the away teams five.

Number of league titles

Northampton Old Scouts (3)
Leighton Buzzard (2)
Old Northamptonians (2)
Towcestrians (2)
Wellingborough (2)
Ampthill (1)
Banbury (1)
Belgrave (1)
Bugbrooke (1)
Dunstablians (1)
Hinckley (1)
Huntingdon & District (1)
Kettering (1)
Lincoln (1)
Melton Mowbray (1)
Nottingham Moderns (1)
Oadby Wyggestonians (1)
Olney (1)
Peterborough (1)
Peterborough Lions (1)
Scunthorpe (1)
South Leicester (1)

Note

See also
Midlands RFU
East Midlands RFU
Leicestershire RU
English rugby union system
Rugby union in England

References

7
3
Rugby union in Bedfordshire
Rugby union in Northamptonshire
Rugby union in Leicestershire